The Jensen Ranch, at 8262 Bethel Ave. in Selma, California dates from 1903. It was built by Christen Jensen. It was nominated for listing on the National Register of Historic Places in 1982, with reference number 82004980, but the listing was declined due to owner objection.

References

Ranches on the National Register of Historic Places in California
Buildings and structures completed in 1903
Buildings and structures in Fresno County, California
National Register of Historic Places in Fresno County, California